Pierre Laroche (1902–1962) was a French journalist, screenwriter and novelist. He was active in the French film industry from the 1940s to the 1960s. Laroche collaborated with Jacques Prévert on the script of Les Visiteurs du Soir (1942).

He was married to the film director Jacqueline Audry with whom he collaborated a number of times.

Selected filmography

 L'enfer des anges (1941)
 Une femme disparaît (1942)
 Les Visiteurs du Soir (1942)
 The Mysteries of Paris (1943)
 A Woman in the Night (1943)
 Summer Light (1943)
 Father Serge (1945)
 Girl with Grey Eyes (1945)
 The Misfortunes of Sophie (1946)
 Coïncidences (1947)
 Noah's Ark (1947)
 The Secret of Monte Cristo (1948)
 Dark Sunday (1948)
 The Woman I Murdered (1948)
 Le cavalier de Croix-Mort (1948)
 Clochemerle (1948)
 Gigi (1949)
 Fantomas Against Fantomas''' (1949)
 The Red Angel (1949)
 Chéri (1950)
 Quay of Grenelle (1950)
 The Cape of Hope (1951)
 Olivia (1951)
 Messalina (1951)
 The Strange Madame X (1951)
 Mammy (1951)
 Sérénade au bourreau (1951)
 They Were Five (1952)
 The Beauty of Cadiz (1953)
 Huis clos (1954)
 Zaza (1956)
 Chaque jour a son secret (1958)
 School for Coquettes (1958)
 It's All Adam's Fault (1958)
 Le secret du Chevalier d'Éon (1959)
 The Black Monocle (1961)
 Operation Gold Ingot (1962)
 The Seventh Juror (1962)
 Girl on the Road (1962)

References

Bibliography
 Lanzoni, Rémi Fournier . French Cinema: From Its Beginnings to the Present''. A&C Black, 2004.

External links

1902 births
1962 deaths
French male screenwriters
Film people from Paris
20th-century French screenwriters